Leu may refer to:

Businesses and organisations
 LEU, NYSE American stock symbol for Centrus Energy Corp.
 London Ecology Unit, a former body (1986-2000) which advised London boroughs on environmental matters
 Free and Equal (LeU - Liberi e Uguali), a political alliance in Italy

Heraldry 
 Leu, archaic term for Wolves in heraldry

Money 
 Moldovan leu, monetary unit of Moldova
 Romanian leu, monetary unit of Romania

Places 
 LEU, IATA code for Andorra–La Seu d'Urgell Airport in Spain
 Leu, Dolj, a commune in Dolj County, Romania

Science and technology 
 Low-enriched uranium, uranium that is enriched but to less than 20% U-235
 Leu (or L), abbreviation for leucine, an amino acid
 Lineside Electronics Unit, a component of the European Train Control System

People with the surname
August Leu (1818–1897), German painter
Mihai Leu (b. 1969), Romanian former professional boxer 

Romanian-language surnames